Foothill High School is a public high school originally located in Redding, California but was moved in the late 1990s to its current location of Palo Cedro, California. It offers grades 9–12. It serves a wide radius from northeastern portions of Redding to the west and Shingletown to the east. Other communities served include Millville, Bella Vista, Oak Run, Whitmore, Round Mountain, Montgomery Creek and Big Bend. The API score for the 2008–2009 school year was 820.

Academics
Foothill provides classes such as Computer Drafting, Exploring Engineering, Advertising on the Web, Photography, Math, and a Multi-Media Class.
Foothill also provides an excellent venue for sporting events.

Mr. Mitch Bahr—band director 2002–present—was nominated and won California State Teacher of the Year in 2016. Thanks to Mr. Bahr, Foothill provides one of the north state's most accessible and talented high school band programs.

References

External links
Foothill High School Website
Foothill Cougar Football Website

High schools in Shasta County, California
Educational institutions established in 1999
Public high schools in California
1999 establishments in California